Vingtaine du Coin Varin is one of the five vingtaines of St Peter Parish on the Channel Island of Jersey.

References 

Coin Varin
Coin Varin
Jersey articles needing attention